Joseph Edmond Marcile (October 22, 1854 – November 5, 1925) was a Canadian politician.

Born in Contrecœur, Canada East, Marcile was educated at the Acton Vale Model School. A merchant, he was a city councilor and mayor of Acton Vale, Quebec. He was first elected to the House of Commons of Canada for the Quebec electoral district of Bagot in an 1898 by-election held after the death of the sitting MP, Flavien Dupont. A Liberal, he would remain undefeated in the following seven elections and serve for almost 27 years until dying in office in 1925.

Electoral record 

  
|Liberal
|Joseph-Edmond Marcile
|align="right"| 1,431   
  
|Conservative
|L.T. Brodeur
|align="right"| 1,384

References
 

1854 births
1925 deaths
Liberal Party of Canada MPs
Mayors of places in Quebec
Members of the House of Commons of Canada from Quebec